SRM University, Andhra Pradesh (SRM AP), also known as SRM University, Amaravati, is a private university located near Neerukonda village in Mangalagiri mandal of Guntur district in Andhra Pradesh, India, in the area of the planned capital city Amaravati. The university was established in 2017 by the SRM Trust through the Andhra Pradesh Private Universities (Establishment and Regulation) Act, 2016. It offers undergraduate, postgraduate courses and Ph.D programmes in engineering, liberal arts and basic sciences.

Academics
SRM University, Andhra Pradesh offers undergraduate, postgraduate courses and Ph.D programmes through its two schools, the School of Engineering & Applied Sciences, launched in 2017, and the School of Liberal Arts & Basic Sciences, which was launched in 2018.

Leadership
The university is led by the president P. Sathyanarayanan, which serves in this position since its establishment in 2017. The inaugural vice-chancellor (VC) of the university was Jamshed Bharucha who was appointed to this position in July 2018. Bharucha was replaced with Vajja Sambasiva Rao in 2020. In 2022, Manoj K. Arora took his place as VC.

Campus

The campus is designed by Perkins and Will, an American architectural firm, and PTK Architects, an architectural firm based in Chennai, India. It has hostel facilities for about 1500 students and faculty, in five apartments.

See also 
 SRM Institute of Science and Technology

References

External links

Universities and colleges in Guntur district
Universities in Andhra Pradesh
Educational institutions established in 2017
2017 establishments in Andhra Pradesh
Private universities in India